The minelayer HNoMS Frøya was built for the Royal Norwegian Navy by the naval shipyard in Horten during World War I, with yard number 108. A fast ship for her time, she was kept in service until the German invasion of Norway in 1940. At some point between her commissioning and 1940, a 76 mm gun was added to her armaments. Frøya was the first purpose-built minelayer commissioned into the RNoN.

Frøya and the invasion
At the time the Germans invaded Norway, Frøya was underway from Finnmark to Horten naval base in the Oslofjord, and on 8 April she anchored at Brekstad harbour at Ørland at the mouth of the Trondheimsfjord. Due to bad weather Captain T. Schrøder-Nielsen was reluctant to cross Hustadvika bay on with the ship's full load of mines and had sought shelter at Brekstad overnight. When, on the morning of 9 April, the German assault came, the crew of the Frøya observed the intruding German warships making their way to Trondheim. Trapped in the fjord, the decision was made to move the minelayer into the nearby Stjørnfjord. In the Stjørnfjord Frøya repeatedly came under attack from both land based artillery and Luftwaffe bombers. On 13 April Captain Schrøder-Nielsen decided all hope was lost and, refusing to let his ship fall into German hands, he ordered her scuttled. After removing some equipment and Frøyas load of mines for possible later use the crew of Frøya rammed their ship at great speed ashore at Søtvika, opened the ship's valves and at 12:30 fired explosive charges, demolishing her. As the U-boat captain believed her still to be salvageable for the Norwegians the submarine torpedoed Frøya, blowing the stern off the already wrecked minelayer.

The wreck today
After she was scuttled, it was still possible to explore the wreck. Even today enough remains to make Frøya an interesting wreck to dive on.

References

Literature

External links

 Naval history via FLIX: Frøya, retrieved 14 March 2006 
 HNoMS Frøya Krigsseilerregisteret 

Maritime incidents in April 1940
Ships built in Horten
Minelayers of the Royal Norwegian Navy
World War II shipwrecks in the Norwegian Sea
World War II minelayers of Norway
1916 ships
Ships sunk with no fatalities
Scuttled vessels
Ships sunk by German submarines in World War II